Flávio Vagner Cipriano (born 24 January 1990) is a Brazilian professional racing cyclist. He rode at the 2015 UCI Track Cycling World Championships.

References

External links
 

1990 births
Living people
People from Taubaté
Brazilian male cyclists
Brazilian track cyclists
Cyclists at the 2011 Pan American Games
Cyclists at the 2015 Pan American Games
Cyclists at the 2019 Pan American Games
Pan American Games bronze medalists for Brazil
Pan American Games medalists in cycling
Medalists at the 2015 Pan American Games
Sportspeople from São Paulo (state)
21st-century Brazilian people
20th-century Brazilian people